Danijel Milovanović (born 18 October 1973) is a Swedish football player. He played for the Swedish club Falkenbergs FF a couple of years, but for the season 2000 he joined Landskrona BoIS.

Career

In 2000, Milovanović scored 11 goals for Landskrona BoIS. In 2001, Milovanović followed up with 9 goals, and the same year Landskrona BoIS reached the highest Swedish football league Allsvenskan.

In 2002 Landskrona BoIS won the first match, a derby against Helsingborgs IF with 6-2, with Milovanović scoring a hat trick. In June, when Allsvenskan took a break for the World Cup, Landskrona BoIS were leading the top league, for the first time since 1980, much thanks to the lethal strikforce of Daniel Nannskog and Milovanović. But 29 July, in a match against Malmö FF he got a knee injury and he couldn't play more that season. He never got back to full fitness and had to retire early.

He scored 6 goals in the top flight.

Civil career

Following his career Milovanović became a police officer.

External links 
 Landskrona's website
 Falkenberg's website
  

1973 births
Swedish footballers
Swedish people of Serbian descent
Falkenbergs FF players
Landskrona BoIS players
FK Bežanija players
Living people
Association football forwards